The 2020–21 Hobart Hurricanes Women's season was the sixth in the team's history. Coached by Salliann Briggs and captained by Corinne Hall, the Hurricanes played the entirety of WBBL06 in a bio-secure Sydney hub due to the COVID-19 pandemic. They finished the regular season in last place, resulting in the team's third wooden spoon in four years.

Squad 
Each 2020–21 squad was made up of 15 active players. Teams could sign up to five 'marquee players', with a maximum of three of those from overseas. Marquees are classed as any overseas player, or a local player who holds a Cricket Australia national contract at the start of the WBBL|06 signing period.

Personnel changes made ahead of the season included:

 New Zealand marquee Rachel Priest signed with the Hurricanes—her third WBBL team, having previously played for the Sydney Thunder and the Melbourne Renegades.
 Erin Fazackerley departed the Hurricanes, signing with the Melbourne Renegades.
 England marquee Heather Knight departed the Hurricanes, signing with the Sydney Thunder.
 Naomi Stalenberg signed with the Hurricanes, departing the Sydney Thunder.
 New Zealand's Hayley Jensen was added to the Hurricanes squad as a marquee replacement player after Tayla Vlaeminck was ruled out of the season through injury. However, Jensen would still only be eligible to play in the place of a fellow overseas marquee player, if or when required.
 Erica Kershaw signed with the Hurricanes, departing the Melbourne Renegades.
 Chloe Rafferty signed with the Hurricanes, having played with the Melbourne Stars in WBBL|05 as an injury replacement.

The table below lists the Hurricanes players and their key stats (including runs scored, batting strike rate, wickets taken, economy rate, catches and stumpings) for the season.

Ladder

Fixtures 

All times are local times

Statistics and awards 
 Most runs: Rachel Priest – 354 (10th in the league)
Highest score in an innings: Rachel Priest – 92* (63) vs Sydney Sixers, 14 November
Most wickets: Hayley Matthews – 12 (equal 15th in the league)
Best bowling figures in an innings: Nicola Carey – 3/14 (3.5 overs) vs Melbourne Renegades, 3 November
Most catches: Nicola Carey – 7 (equal 6th in the league)
Player of the Match awards:
Nicola Carey, Hayley Matthews, Rachel Priest – 1 each
WBBL06 Young Gun: Amy Smith (week 3 nominee)
Hurricanes Most Valuable Player: Rachel Priest

References 

2020–21 Women's Big Bash League season by team
Hobart Hurricanes (WBBL)